Interstate 405 (I-405) is a major north–south auxiliary Interstate Highway in Southern California. The entire route is known as the northern segment of the San Diego Freeway. I-405 is a bypass auxiliary route of I-5, running along the southern and western parts of the Greater Los Angeles urban area from Irvine in the south to near San Fernando in the north.

I-405, heavily traveled by both commuters and freight haulers along its entire length, is the busiest and most congested freeway in the United States. The freeway's annual average daily traffic between exits 21 and 22 in Seal Beach reached 374,000 in 2008, making it the highest count in the nation. It has played a crucial role in the development of dozens of cities and suburbs along its route through Los Angeles and Orange counties. It also serves Los Angeles International Airport, Long Beach Airport, and Orange County's John Wayne Airport.

Route description

Orange County

I-405 begins at the El Toro Y interchange in southeastern Irvine in Orange County, splitting from its parent I-5 and inheriting that route's San Diego Freeway title; I-5 continues north as the Santa Ana Freeway. The freeway passes immediately south of the Irvine Spectrum Center mall before intersecting with State Route 133 (SR 133). It then continues through Irvine, passing north of the University of California, Irvine, and then along the northern boundary of John Wayne Airport. After passing the airport, the freeway enters Costa Mesa and has an interchange with SR 55. It passes South Coast Plaza before a partial interchange with SR 73, which serves as a partially-tolled bypass of I-405 between Costa Mesa and Laguna Niguel.

The freeway then travels through Fountain Valley and along the edges of Westminster and Huntington Beach before entering Seal Beach, where it begins to run concurrently with SR 22. It continues along the northern edge of Seal Beach, passing between Naval Weapons Station Seal Beach and Joint Forces Training Base - Los Alamitos, before SR 22 splits from I-405 and continues west while the freeway turns north. I-405 then intersects the southern end of I-605 before crossing the San Gabriel River and entering Los Angeles County.

Los Angeles County
I-405 enters Los Angeles County in the city of Long Beach. It passes to the north of California State University, Long Beach, and then along the south of Long Beach Airport. The freeway then intersects with I-710 before entering Carson (and crossing through a small sliver of the city of Los Angeles before reentering Carson). It passes near California State University, Dominguez Hills, and Dignity Health Sports Park, home of Major League Soccer club LA Galaxy.

The freeway then intersects with I-110 as it briefly reenters the city of Los Angeles by passing through the Harbor Gateway, a strip of land connecting San Pedro to the rest of the city. I-405 then continues to roughly parallel the contour of the coastline as it passes through the South Bay communities of Torrance, Lawndale, Redondo Beach, Hawthorne, and El Segundo. The freeway then encounters I-105 on the southeastern corner of Los Angeles International Airport. It passes to the east of the airport, serving it with exits at the Imperial Highway and Century Boulevard.

I-405 next passes through Inglewood, coming near SoFi Stadium, home to the Los Angeles Rams and Los Angeles Chargers of the National Football League. It then passes through Westchester and Culver City where it meets SR 90, the Marina Freeway. It serves the Los Angeles neighborhoods of Mar Vista and West Los Angeles while passing a few miles east of Santa Monica, intersecting with I-10 in the process. The freeway continues into Westwood, passing just to the west of University of California, Los Angeles. It then passes the Getty Center as it ascends Sepulveda Pass through the Santa Monica Mountains.

After cresting the mountains, I-405 descends into the San Fernando Valley, intersecting US Route 101 (US 101) in the Sherman Oaks neighborhood of Los Angeles. The freeway then continues due north through the western part of the valley, passing east of Van Nuys Airport and California State University, Northridge. It intersects SR 118 in the Mission Hills area before ending in a merge with I-5 near San Fernando.

I-405 is part of the California Freeway and Expressway System and is part of the National Highway System, a network of highways that are considered essential to the country's economy, defense, and mobility by the Federal Highway Administration. The entire freeway is known as the San Diego Freeway, and parts of it are less commonly known as the Sepulveda Freeway (after Sepulveda Boulevard).

Traffic congestion

The freeway is one of the busiest freeways in the nation and is the busiest freeway in California. The freeway's congestion problems are well-known, leading to jokes that the road was numbered 405 because traffic moves at "four or five" miles per hour, or because drivers had spent "four or five" hours to travel anywhere. As a result of these congestion problems, delays passing through the entirety of Greater Los Angeles using this bypass route instead of merely using the primary route I-5 through Downtown Los Angeles may be present.

I-405 is the only major north–south freeway in the densely populated areas between West Los Angeles and Downtown Los Angeles, crossing the Santa Monica Mountains and connecting the San Fernando Valley and the Los Angeles Basin. It is also a major connection for traffic en route to either the Port of Los Angeles, the Port of Long Beach, Los Angeles International Airport, or SoFi Stadium. By 2040, this corridor is estimated to increase by 35 percent and travel times reduced by 75 percent.

Another parallel freeway is proposed to connect the valley and basin (the Laurel Canyon Freeway or La Cienega Freeway) but has faced upper-class homeowner opposition. Despite four years of construction disruptions and billions of dollars of public money, Los Angeles Times commentary claims traffic with the lane expansions is actually just as bad or worse. 

Unlike some of the other major travel corridors in the region (such as I-5 which parallels the LOSSAN Corridor), I-405 has no rail-based public transit which parallels it along the west side of Orange and Los Angeles counties. There is a proposal for a Sepulveda Transit Corridor which would parallel I-405 through Sepulveda Pass, one of the major bottlenecks on the route, which would ease congestion by providing an alternative to driving.

History

I-405 was approved as a chargeable Interstate (in other words, an Interstate financed with federal funds) in 1955. Construction began in 1957 with the first section, mostly north of Los Angeles International Airport, completed in 1961 (signed as SR 7) followed by sections west of I-605 within the following few years. The highway was renumbered to I-405 during the 1964 state highway renumbering. The final section covering most of Orange County opened in 1969. Construction required already existing Mulholland Highway to be rerouted  to the south along a new  bridge, the Mulholland Drive Bridge, to span I-405.

"Carmageddon"
A section of I-405 was closed over the weekend of Friday, July 15, 2011, as part of the Sepulveda Pass Improvements Project. Before the closing, local radio DJs and television newscasts referred to it as "Carmageddon" and "Carpocalypse", parodying the notion of Armageddon and the Apocalypse, since it was anticipated that the closure would severely impact traffic. In reality, traffic was lighter than normal across a wide area. The California Department of Transportation (Caltrans) reported that fewer vehicles used the roads than usual, and those who did travel by road arrived more quickly than on a normal weekend. The Metrolink commuter train system recorded its highest-ever weekend ridership since it began operating in 1991. Ridership was 50 percent higher than the same weekend in 2010 and 10 percent higher than the previous weekend ridership record, which occurred during the U2 360° Tour in June 2011. The Los Angeles Times on Sunday, July 17, 2011, featured comments and images of people enjoying the moment next to the I-405 freeway with the free-flowing traffic.

In response to JetBlue's offer of special flights between Hollywood Burbank Airport in Burbank and Long Beach Airport, a distance of only , for $4.00, a group of cyclists did the same journey in one and a half hours, compared to two and a half hours by plane (including a drive to the airport from West Hollywood 90 minutes in advance of the flight and travel time to the end destination). There was also some debate about whether the Los Angeles area could benefit from car-free weekends regularly.

The Los Angeles County Metropolitan Transportation Authority then had full closure of a  stretch of I-405 on the weekend of September 29–30, 2012, while construction crews worked to demolish a portion of the Mulholland Bridge.

Researchers at the University of California, Los Angeles, used the closure of I-405 to study particulate matter air pollution. The researchers took air samples before, during, and after the closure. The researchers found an 83-percent reduction in ultrafine particles, 55-percent reduction in fine particle matter, and 62-percent less black carbon.

Sepulveda Pass Improvements Project
The $1-billion Sepulveda Pass Improvements Project added a high-occupancy vehicle (HOV) lane and associated changes to freeway entrances, exits, and underpasses along a  stretch through Sepulveda Pass between I-10 and US 101/Ventura Boulevard. The project was completed as a design–build in contrast to the traditional design–bid–build used typically in infrastructure improvement. This section of I-405 was closed for a weekend in mid-July 2011 to demolish the Mulholland Drive Bridge, and a  section was closed for the last weekend of September 2012.

Jamzilla was the name for the I-405 closure on Presidents' Day weekend 2014. There were lane closures and complete closures on I-405 starting February 14 at 10:00 pm until February 18 at 6:00 am to pave and restripe the northbound lanes.

On May 23, 2014, the  HOV lane was opened to traffic.

Future

Manchester and Century Boulevard interchanges
Proposed changes between the Manchester and Century Boulevard interchanges in the city of Inglewood are to provide a new southbound onramp and a new northbound offramp for Arbor Vitae Street, to reconstruct and widened the Arbor Vitae Street over-bridge and replace the Century Boulevard overcrossing structure. This work would reduce congestion on the approach to Los Angeles International Airport. Caltrans has not yet issued a start date for this work.

Express and mixed flow lanes
The Orange County Transportation Authority is currently adding a high-occupancy toll (HOT) express lane and one mixed flow lane in each direction between SR 73 in Costa Mesa and I-605 in Seal Beach. The I-405 Improvement Project started construction in 2018 and is planned to be completed by late 2023. Each vehicle using the HOT lanes would be required to carry a FasTrak transponder. The lanes would be a 24/7 service. Solo drivers would be tolled using a congestion pricing system based on the real-time levels of traffic. For two-person carpools, they would be charged the posted toll during weekday peak hours between 6:00 am and 10:00 am and between 3:00 pm and 8:00 pm and weekend peak hours between 1:00 pm and 6:00 pm; no toll would charged during off-peak hours until  years after their opening. Carpools with three or more occupants would have toll-free access at all times.

The HOV lanes that were constructed as part of the Sepulveda Pass Improvements Project are also proposed to be upgraded to express lanes by 2028.

Incidents

O. J. Simpson chase, 1994

While dangerous high-speed chases along the San Diego Freeway are not uncommon, perhaps the most famous chase in its history was also one of the slowest. On the afternoon of June 17, 1994, former athlete and actor O. J. Simpson, who was accused of murdering his ex-wife Nicole Brown Simpson and waiter Ron Goldman, took to the freeway in a white Ford Bronco (driven by former teammate Al Cowlings) with police in pursuit. A widely televised low-speed chase ensued and ended hours later when Simpson returned to his Brentwood, Los Angeles, home and surrendered to law enforcement.

Ennis Cosby murder, 1997

Ennis Cosby, the only son of Bill Cosby, was murdered near I-405 in Los Angeles on January 16, 1997, while fixing a flat tire.

Exit list

See also

References

External links

California @ AARoads.com - I-405
Caltrans: Route 405 highway conditions
California Highways: I-405

4 California
05-4
Interstate 405
Interstate 405
405
05-4 California
405